Luna is the second album by the Scottish band The Aliens. It was released on Monday 29 September 2008, preceded by a new single, 'Magic Man', on Monday 22 September. Both releases came out on the band’s own record label, Pet Rock Records.  "Boats" is reworked version of a song by the same name on the Lone Pigeon 2004 album Schoozzzmmii.  Besides being more hi-fi, the Alien's arrangement is also more filled out (3 minutes longer) and slightly more up tempo.

Track listing 
 "Bobby’s Song" (10:26)
 "Amen" (1:18)
 "Theremin" (3:16)
 "Everyone" (4:09)
 "Magic Man" (5:18)
 "Billy Jack" (10:25)
 "Luna" (3:35)
 "Dove Returning" (3:12)
 "Sunlamp Show" (4:53)
 "Smoggy Bog" (1:54)
 "Daffodils" (3:21)
 "Boats" (6:17)
 "Blue Mantle" (8:12)

All songs written by Lone Pigeon aka Gordon Anderson

References

External links
The Aliens announce new album details - NME

2008 albums
The Aliens (Scottish band) albums
Experimental pop albums